Janus Island is a rocky island  long, lying  south of Litchfield Island, off the southwest coast of Anvers Island in the Palmer Archipelago. Janus Island is the southernmost of the islands on the west side of the entrance to Arthur Harbor. Janus Island was named by the United Kingdom Antarctic Place-names Committee (UK-APC) following survey by the Falkland Islands Dependencies Survey (FIDS) in 1955. The name Janus Island, for the ancient Roman deity Janus who was guardian of gates, arose because of the position of the island at the entrance to Arthur Harbor.

See also
 Composite Antarctic Gazetteer
 List of Antarctic and sub-Antarctic islands
 List of Antarctic islands south of 60° S
 SCAR
 Territorial claims in Antarctica

References

Islands of the Palmer Archipelago